Gordon Joseph "Gordy" Ceresino is a former professional American football linebacker who played one season with the San Francisco 49ers in 1979.

Ceresino played college football for Stanford University and was named the most valuable defensive player of both the 1977 Sun Bowl (in which Stanford defeated LSU 24-14) and the 1978 Bluebonnet Bowl, in which Stanford defeated Georgia 25-22. He is a member of the Stanford Athletic Hall of Fame.

He now lives in San Diego, California. His daughter Jessica was a midfielder for the University of Colorado women's soccer team.

References

1957 births
American football linebackers
Living people
San Francisco 49ers players
Sportspeople from Thunder Bay
Stanford Cardinal football players
Canadian players of American football